Voore is a village in Mustvee Parish, Jõgeva County in Estonia. With a population of 320 it's the largest village in the municipality. 

There are two hill forts in the village territory. One of them originates from the beginning of 2nd millennium and other is most likely from the same time.

Voore was the site of Medieval knight manor known as Roela Manor (Rojel). It was first mentioned in the 16th century when it belonged to the von Brackels. After that it was owned by the von Wrangells, and from 1725 till the dispossession in 1919 to the von Lipharts. The historicist 2-storey main building was erected in the 1850s–60s. It burned down in World War II during the battle of Roela on 31 July 1941. Most of the ruins were demolished in the 1970s, only a tower and some foundations have survived. Also the park and the alleys have survived. There's a singing stage inside the park.

The history of Voore Primary School dated back to 1774. In 1895 the nearby Kallivere and Vassevere schools were merged and a new schoolhouse was built on the hillside of Leedimägi. From 1924 to 1979 the school bore the name of Leedimäe. Since 1970 the school operates in the former local government building. Old schoolhouse is now part of Voore Guesthouse complex.

Voore village was established in 1977 by merging the Roela settlement with Linnamäe, Mägivälja villages and the northern part of Vassevere village.

Besides the school there's a guesthouse, library and a shop in Voore.

The Kullavere River passes through Voore, there's the Voore impounded lake.

Writer, essayist and theatre director Mati Unt (1944–2005) was born in Linnamäe village which is now part of Voore village. Actor Leonhard Merzin (1934–1990) was born in nearby Aruküla village (now part of Maardla).

References

External links
Voore Guesthouse 
Voore Primary School 
Voore Library 

Villages in Jõgeva County